Phyllopetalia stictica is a species of dragonfly in the family Austropetaliidae. It is endemic to Chile. Its natural habitat is rivers. It is threatened by habitat loss.

References

Austropetaliidae
Fauna of Chile
Insects of South America
Taxa named by Hermann August Hagen
Taxonomy articles created by Polbot
Endemic fauna of Chile